Plinth may refer to:

 Plinth, a base especially for statues, steles, etc.
 Plinth (hieroglyph), an Egyptian language hieroglyph
 Plinth Peak, of the Cascade Volcanic Arc